Shri Durga Devi temple, Guhagar is an ancient temple located at Guhagar, a taluka place in Ratnagiri district of Maharashtra state in India. It is considered to be the Kuladevata or clan goddess of many Brahmin families from the Konkan region.

It is located in Warla Pat (Upper Side) of Guhagar Gaon. The Temple is old with full of greenery along with Bhakta Niwas in nearby location. It is considered to be oldest temple and has been renewed in the recent past. During Navratri festival the temple is full of devotees who come to offer their offering to Shree Durga Devi from across India.

This is one of the pleasant sea-side temples, to visit during summer and winter season. One can find all required amenities in the nearby location. Puja's can be performed on request.

Story
According to the Hindu mythology, goddess defeated the ill energies in one night and saved Guhagar from possible destruction. During her war with the enemy, a pearl from one of the ornaments was broken. Goddess ordered one of her devotees to collect the broken pearl from a tree near the seashore. Even today, the said pearl is in the ornamental collection of the goddess and occasionally it is kept in the main hall for display purpose.

Another story tells that once a person with rash on his body due to some allergy, came to the temple. He was suffering from unbearable pain. He sat in the temple premises for three consecutive days without food and water and was just chanting the name of goddess. On third day the goddess came in the form of an old lady. She gave him some oil for application on the rash and in further three days period, the rash along with pains got vanished.

The goddess also killed a devil named Mahishasura and hence got the name Mahishasoor Mardini

Surroundings
Around the temple, there is a lake with a central wooden pillar. There are four temples of the subordinate shrines at four corners of the main temple, thus converting it into Panchayatan style temple. A Panchayatana temple has four subordinate shrines on four corners and the main shrine in the center of the podium, which comprises their base. Here, the main shrine at the center is of Shri Durga (Goddess Shakti) and the other deities at the surrounding are: The Sun, Shri Ganesh, Shri Shiva and Shri Vishnu along with goddess Lakshmi.

Pillar Near Temple (Devicha Khamb)
It is believed that the old temple was near the main road and it is shifted to current location in the Middle Ages. A pillar was erected at that time to remember the original location of old temple. In local Marathi language the pillar is called Devicha Khamb. The said pillar can be seen in the adjacent photograph.

Holy Aarti
Aarti is a holy prayer in the name of a specific god.

Gallery

References

External links
Velavan Beach House -Coastal Homestay at Guhagar

Hindu temples in Maharashtra
Tourist attractions in Ratnagiri district